The Vergara family in Chile is spread across several branches, all considered amongst the founding families of Chile having arrived as conquistadors, most of which are related to each other that established themselves in various regions of what is today Chile.

Vergara 

Vergara is a toponymic named after the spanish version of the Basque region of Bergara found in Guipúzcoa, Basque Country.

Santiago branch

First migration 
The first of the family to arrive in Chile was Gaspar de Vergara, born in Villaflores, Salamanca, of Basque origin and son of the secretary of Bergara and Maria Hernandez Jiron. He arrived in Chile in 1536, joining Diego de Almagro's expeditions and then, in 1540, with Pedro de Valdivia onto the founding of Santiago, Chile. He never married though he recognized his children, all daughters:

Children 
 Ines de Vergara, married to Sebastian Garcia
 Luisa de Vergara, married to Juan Fernandez Garces and then to Antonio Lozano
 Francisca de Vergara, married to captain Cristobal Salvador Celaya. Their son Gaspar Salvador de Vergara carried the Vergara name to his descendants

Second migration 
In the second half of the 18th century, another member of the broader Vergara family came to Chile: Antonio de Vergara, who married Manuela Garcia.

Talca branch 

This branch was founded by royal lieutenant, Juan Martínez de Vergara, born in Guipuzcoa, Basque in 1589 and died in Chimbarongo, Colchagua in 1662.

A hidalgo, he arrived in South America destined for Chile and the War of Arauco in 1601. He was enlisted in the troops who accompanied Governor Alonso de Ribera, who was considered the organizer of the army in the kingdom of Chile. He was in the company commanded by Captain Gines de Lillo and helped with his arms in the forts of Santa Fe and Talcahuano. In 1628 he was already in the rank of captain. He was the backbone one of the most important Chilean colonial families and given an encomienda for his services to the Spanish Crown.

Son of Juan Martínez de Vergara, a native of Guipuzcoa and Isabel Alonso Marquez, a neighbor, of Gibraleón. She was the daughter of Teresa Alonso Marquez, and of the same region.

In 1634 he married Magdalena de Leiva Sepulveda, daughter of a Sevillian captain, Antonio de Leiva Sepulveda and Mariana de la Cerda Niza y Corral.

Children 

 Juan Martínez de Vergara y Leiva Sepulveda born in Chillán in 1645 and married on 22 October 1670 in Santiago with Ana Gomez Ceballo y Ugarte Escobar. He died at his ranch in Talcamo (Talca) on 18 January 1723.
 Isabel Martínez de Vergara y Sepulveda Leiva married an Asturian Maestre de Campo, Pedro Fernández de Albuerne Ondina. He wrote his will on his ranch in San Francisco Talcamo (Talca) Paguelo on 11 December 1676 and died in 1677.
 Mariana Leiva Martínez de Vergara y Sepulveda married on 8 July 1662 in Nancagua with the Spanish gentleman, Lieutenant José Antonio de Labra y Vega, a native of Cangas de Onis and Maestre de Campo in 1660. She died 8 March 1702.
 Francisca Martínez de Vergara y Sepulveda married Rodrigo Leiva Verdugo de Sarria y de la Corte.
 Jacinta Martinez Vergara y Sepulveda married Domingo Valdés y Fernandez de Villalobos.

La Serena 

Another branch established itself in La Serena, Chile by Francisco de Vergara in the 18th century who married Maria Antonia de Santelices Corbalan.

See also 
 Talca
 Quinta Vergara
 History of Chile

References

External links
Genealogical chart of Vergara family 

 
17th-century Chilean people
Chilean families
Chilean families of Basque ancestry
Chilean people of Basque descent
Roman Catholic families